Egmondville is an unincorporated rural community in Huron East, Huron County, Ontario, Canada.

History
The community was founded in 1845 by Constant Van Egmond, the eldest son of Anthony Van Egmond and named in honour of his father.  Van Edmonds and son Constant were contracted in the 1830s to widen Huron Road and became the largest landowners in the area.  Constant Van Egmond became a local magistrate.

See also
List of communities in Ontario

References

Sources
Lee, Robert C., (2004). The Canada Company and The Huron Tract, 1826–1853. Natural Heritage Books, Toronto On. , pp. 80, 84, 129, 154–155, 257
Bart-Riedstra, Carolynn, (2002). Stratford. Arcadia Publishing, p. 18
Coleman, Thelma, (1978). The Canada Company, County of Perth, Stratford On. , pp. 172–173

Communities in Huron County, Ontario